United Nations Security Council resolution 1452, adopted unanimously on 20 December 2002, after recalling resolutions 1267 (1999), 1333 (2000), 1363 (2001), 1368 (2001) and 1390 (2001) concerning Al-Qaeda, the Taliban and terrorism, the Council decided that financial sanctions against the organisations would not apply to expenses for food, rent, medicine and medical care, health insurance and professional fees.

The Security Council reaffirmed Resolution 1373 (2001) and its determination to facilitate the implementation of counterterrorism obligations. Acting under Chapter VII of the United Nations Charter, the Security Council exempted funds necessary for basic expenses such as food, rent, medical care and professional fees and extraordinary expenses from financial sanctions against Osama bin Laden, the Taliban and Al-Qaeda. At the same time, it decided that the provision not to freeze accounts on humanitarian grounds no longer applied. States could also allow the addition of interest or other earnings to the accounts.

See also
 List of United Nations Security Council Resolutions 1401 to 1500 (2002–2003)
 Terrorist financing

References

External links
 
Text of the Resolution at undocs.org

 1452
 1452
Al-Qaeda
Taliban
December 2002 events